Walsh may refer to:

People and fictional characters
 Walsh (surname), including a list of people and fictional characters

Places

Australia
 Mount Walsh, Mount Walsh National Park

Canada
 Fort Walsh, one of the first Royal Canadian Mounted Police posts, site of the Cypress Hills Massacre
 Walsh, Alberta, a hamlet
 Walsh, Ontario, a hamlet
 Walsh Lake, Quebec

United States
 Walsh, Colorado, a Statutory Town
 Walsh, Michigan, a former settlement
 Walsh, Wisconsin, an unincorporated community
 Walsh County, North Dakota

Schools
 Walsh School of Foreign Service, Georgetown University, Washington, D.C.
 Walsh University, North Canton, Ohio, a private Catholic university
 Walsh College, Troy, Michigan
 Walsh Jesuit High School, Cuyahoga Falls, Ohio

Other uses
 , a planned United States Navy guided missile destroyer
 USS Walsh (APD-111), a United States Navy high-speed transport in commission from 1945 to 1946
 Walsh baronets, two extinct titles, one in the Baronetage of Ireland and one in the Baronetage of the United Kingdom
 Walsh convention, a bidding convention in contract bridge

See also
 Walshe (disambiguation)
 Welsh (disambiguation)